JWH-019 is an analgesic chemical from the naphthoylindole family that acts as a cannabinoid agonist at both the CB1 and CB2 receptors. It is the N-hexyl homolog of the more common synthetic cannabinoid compound JWH-018. Unlike the butyl homolog JWH-073, which is several times weaker than JWH-018, the hexyl homolog is only slightly less potent, although extending the chain one carbon longer to the heptyl homolog JWH-020 results in dramatic loss of activity. These results show that the optimum side chain length for CB1 binding in the naphthoylindole series is the five-carbon pentyl chain, shorter than in the classical cannabinoids where a seven-carbon heptyl chain produces the most potent compounds. This difference is thought to reflect a slightly different binding conformation adopted by the naphthoylindole compounds as compared to the classical cannabinoids, and may be useful in characterizing the active site of the CB1 and CB2 receptors.

Legal status

China

As of October 2015 JWH-019 is a controlled substance in China.

Poland
In Poland, JWH-019 is I-N (Poland).

Sweden
JWH-019 is illegal in Sweden.

United Kingdom
JWH-019 is Class B in the United Kingdom.

United States
JWH-019 is a Schedule I controlled substance, controlled federally in the United States.

See also 
JWH-007
JWH-018
JWH-073
JWH-200
List of JWH cannabinoids

References 

Naphthoylindoles
JWH cannabinoids
Designer drugs
CB1 receptor agonists
CB2 receptor agonists